The Saco Heath Preserve is a  preserve located in Saco, Maine. It is managed by The Nature Conservancy. 

It contains one of the largest stands of Atlantic White Cedar in Maine and supports one of only two populations in Maine of the Hessel's hairstreak butterfly.

The preserve contains a narrow 1-mile long boardwalk winding through a small portion of the bog and was closed during the COVID-19 pandemic.

References

External links

Saco, Maine
Protected areas of York County, Maine
Nature Conservancy preserves